Thalassodes immissaria is a moth of the family Geometridae first described by Francis Walker in 1861. It is found in the Oriental tropics of China, India, Myanmar,  Sri Lanka, Hong Kong, Japan, Borneo, Vietnam, Sumatra, Sulawesi and the Ryukyu Islands. The populations in Ryukyu were often classified as a subspecies - Thalassodes immissaria intaminata Inoue, 1971. However, in 2005 this subspecies was upgraded to a distinct species, which can be distinguished from immissaria by careful examination of the male genitalia. 

It is a green moth with faint white lines. There is a very narrow yellowish line border on the wings. Male have plumose (feather-like) antennae, female has filiform (thread-like) antennae. It is very similar to other congener species, therefore identification should done through examination of genitalis. In the male, the genitalia possess a long, tongue-like valva basal process and a tongue-like harpe. The caterpillar feeds on Mangifera indica, Lagerstroemia, Nephelium,
Eucalyptus camaldulensis, Dimocarpus longan and Litchi chinensis.

References

External links
Novel components of the sex pheromones produced by emerald moths: identification, synthesis, and field evaluation
Semiochemicals of Thalassodes immissaria intaminata

Moths of Asia
Moths described in 1861
Hemitheini